The 2005 New Zealand general election took place on 17 September 2005 and determined the composition of the 48th New Zealand Parliament. The table below lists all the political parties and the members of parliaments in the New Zealand Parliament, 48th New Zealand Parliament. The political parties are listed alphabetically and the members of parliaments in each party are ranked according to their caucus ranking.

Act Party's parliamentary caucus

Green Party's parliamentary caucus

Jim Anderton's Progressive Party's parliamentary caucus

Labour Party's parliamentary caucus

Maori Party's parliamentary caucus

National Party's parliamentary caucus

New Zealand First's parliamentary caucus

United Future Party's parliamentary caucus

Independents' parliamentary caucus

References 
The information in this page has been obtained from the official New Zealand Parliament website, https://web.archive.org/web/20060827065942/http://www.parliament.govt.nz/, and each party's own website. These are Labour Party (http://www.labour.org.nz), National Party (http://www.national.org.nz), New Zealand First (https://web.archive.org/web/20061209164957/http://www.nzfirst.org.nz/index.php), New Zealand Greens Party (http://www.greens.org.nz), Maori Party (https://web.archive.org/web/20081002022356/http://maoriparty.com/), United Future Party (https://web.archive.org/web/20080913233410/http://www.unitedfuture.org.nz/), ACT Party (http://www.act.org.nz) and Jim Anderton's Progressive Party (https://web.archive.org/web/20130406220418/http://www.progressive.org.nz/). In addition, cabinet committees' information is obtained from the Department of Prime Minister and the Cabinet Website (http://www.dpmc.govt.nz.

Politics of New Zealand
2005 New Zealand general election